Andrew Barcham (born 16 December 1986) is an English professional footballer who last played for AFC Wimbledon as a winger.

Career

Tottenham Hotspur and loan to Leyton Orient
Born in Basildon, Essex, Barcham became a full-time member of the Tottenham Hotspur academy, and became a professional footballer in 2005. He made 19 appearances for the reserve team, including 15 starts and scored a goal in the win against Arsenal that gave Tottenham an initiative in the title race. That season, he was also top scorer for the under-18's side, with 10 goals in 22 starts. An extremely tenacious forward, he was used predominantly on the right for Tottenham's reserves.

In November 2006, Barcham made his first team debut for the Tottenham Hotspur's in the Football League Cup win against Port Vale. In November 2007 he joined Leyton Orient on loan until the end of the season, and made his debut against Millwall.

Gillingham
Barcham joined Gillingham of League Two on 25 September 2008, originally on loan, and made his debut in a home victory against Port Vale two days later, a game in which he was named as Man of the Match. He scored his first goal for the Gills in the 2–0 home victory over Chester City, and signed for the Kent club on a six-month deal in January 2009. Barcham was named the Kent side's Player of the Season in 2009–10. He signed a two-year contract with the club that summer, but left at its conclusion in 2011.

Scunthorpe United
On 28 June, Barcham signed for League One side Scunthorpe United on a two-year deal. He made his debut on 13 August, scoring the equalising goal of a 1–1 home draw against Preston North End. He finished the season as the club's top scorer, with nine goals.

On 3 May 2013, he was released by Scunthorpe after the club was relegated to League Two.

Portsmouth
Later in the month, Barcham signed for Portsmouth on a three-year contract. He made his debut in a 4–1 home defeat to Oxford United on 3 August 2013, and scored his first goal on 24 August, in a 2–2 away draw against Mansfield Town.

AFC Wimbledon
On 1 July 2015, after rescinding his deal with Pompey, Barcham signed for AFC Wimbledon.

Barcham was released by AFC Wimbledon on 11 May 2019.

Career statistics

1 Including the Football League Trophy.

Honours
AFC Wimbledon
Football League Two play-offs: 2016

Individual 

 AFC Wimbledon Team of the Decade (2010s)
 Gillingham Player of the Season: 2009–10

References

External links

1986 births
Living people
Sportspeople from Basildon
English footballers
England youth international footballers
Association football wingers
Association football forwards
Association football utility players
Tottenham Hotspur F.C. players
Leyton Orient F.C. players
Gillingham F.C. players
Scunthorpe United F.C. players
Portsmouth F.C. players
AFC Wimbledon players
English Football League players